E. australis  may refer to:
 Elsinoë australis, a plant pathogen species that causes sweet orange scab
 Emex australis, a synonym of Rumex hypogaeus, the doublegee or three-cornered jack, a herbaceous plant species found in South Africa and Australia
 Eubalaena australis, the Southern right whale, a baleen whale species

See also
 Australis (disambiguation)